In Gayle We Trust is a comedic digital series developed and produced by Ryan Noggle NBCUniversal Digital Studio in partnership with Andy Hayman at Mindshare Entertainment and the show's sole sponsor, American Family Insurance.  The series centers around Gayle Evans (Elisa Donovan), a small-town insurance agent and her host of colorful and quirky clients.
 
Season one, written and directed by Brent Forrester (The Office (US), The Simpsons) premiered in September 2009. Season two, directed by Sandy Smolan and written by Tim McKeon and Kevin Seccia, premiered in July 2010.  Season three, which follows the town's pursuit of staging an insurance-themed, Broadway-style musical, launched in October 2011.  Season three was directed by Jason Farrand and written by Anthony Q. Farrell, Ryan Noggle and Andy Hayman.

Plot

Season 1 (2009) 
Nestled somewhere in the middle of America, Maple Grove is populated with a host of colorful characters, and they all turn to one person for insurance needs, counseling and much much more. Though an insurance agent by trade, Gayle Evans has become the default cure-all for the small town, as her pleasant disposition and sound advice has made her a go-to resource in the lives of her clients. From a newlywed couple seeking weekly marital advice, to an overconfident plumber trying to protect his coveted identity, to a traveling hypnotist needing liability coverage, Gayle's clientele range from sympathetic to pathetic to outright bizarre.

Season 2 (2010) 
In Season 2, Gayle's clientele range from sweet to sympathetic to outright bizarre. From first-time expecting parents needing baby advice, to a plumber-by-day-rock-star-by-night egomaniac, to a hair-brained hair stylist in need of small business insurance, Gayle's got her hands full. She becomes a friend, psychiatrist and advisor to the colorful and quirky locals of Maple Grove.

Season 3 (2011) 
Returning from lunch on an idle Monday, Maple Grove insurance agent Gayle Evans is approached by a bombastic stranger. Theatrical and overly confident, Rafael reveals to Gayle that he’s oh so close to completing his first musical, Policies! Policies!, a love story about a small town insurance agent who helps his clients’ dreams come true. Rafael has arrived in the Midwestern hamlet to not only find inspiration from his muse, Gayle, but furthermore to stage the entire production in all of its grandeur before introducing Broadway to its next blockbuster smash hit.

We soon learn, however, that Rafael is not the gifted impresario he presents, but rather an insecure man with a half-baked script. Finding herself in the eye of the tornado, Gayle must now juggle clueless executive producers, a wannabe movie star, a melodramatic teen diva, an actor with paralyzing stage fright, an always bitter rival and many more roadblocks in her pursuit of protecting Rafael’s dream and helping it become fully realized. Will Gayle pull everyone together and make “Policies! Policies!” the crowd-pleasing, roof-raising hit Rafael always knew it could be?

Response 
Season one of In Gayle We Trust attracted nearly 3 million views. In aggregate, the branded digital series yielded a 20% lift in quote starts and a 24% increase in purchase intent for American Family Insurance. Since its online debut, In Gayle We Trust has garnered 24 million viewers at a 76% completion rate.

References

2009 web series debuts
American comedy web series